Nikolay Viktorovich Lyubimov (born 1971, Kaluga) is a Russian politician, since 2017 - 2022 served as governor of the Ryazan Oblast. Previously he was member of the 7th State Duma of the Russian Federation, Deputy Governor of the Kaluga Oblast (2011-2015), mayor of Kaluga in 2007–2010.

Career 
In 1993 he graduated from the Faculty of History of Kaluga State University (teacher of history and social and political disciplines). In 2001 he graduated from Moscow Humanitarian-Economic Institute (jurisprudence).

2004-2007 — Minister of Economic Development of the Kaluga Oblast.

2007-2010 — Mayor of Kaluga.

December 2010-September 2015 — Deputy Governor of the Kaluga Oblast.

September 2011-September 2015 Deputy Governor of the Kaluga Oblast — the head of the Administration of the Governor of the Kaluga Oblast.

September 13, 2015, at the election of deputies of the Legislative Assembly of Kaluga Oblast of the VI convocation, he was elected to the party list of United Russia.

September 18, 2016, he was elected to the 7th State Duma of the Russian Federation.

February 14, 2017, by decree of President Vladimir Putin's Russia, he was appointed acting governor of the Ryazan Oblast. Before taking office, he was elected Governor of the Ryazan Region.

On May 10, 2022, he announced his refusal to be re-elected to the post of governor in the next election.

Personal life 
Married. Two children.

References

External links 
 
 Страница губернатора на сайте Правительства Рязанской области
 Страница Николай Любимова на сайте Государственной Думы Российской Федерации
 Страница Н. В. Любимова на сайте Законодательного Собрания Калужской области

1971 births
Living people
People from Kaluga
Seventh convocation members of the State Duma (Russian Federation)
United Russia politicians
21st-century Russian politicians
Mayors of Kaluga
21st-century Russian historians
Russian jurists
Governors of Ryazan Oblast
Kaluga State University alumni